James Walsh (born 13 December 1983) is an Irish hurler from Ballinakill in Laois. He plays in midfield for Ballinakill and for Laois. He is also the captain for Laois.

References

1983 births
Living people
Laois inter-county hurlers
Ballinakill hurlers